This is a list of earthquakes that occurred in Sichuan province of China.

Earthquakes with magnitude of 7.0 or greater

Earthquakes registering magnitudes between 6.0 and 6.9

See also
List of earthquakes in Yunnan

References 

Sichuan
 
earthquakes